5x86 may refer to:
Cyrix Cx5x86, computer chip made by Cyrix
Am5x86, 486 computer chip made by AMD

See also
x86 for a more general explanation of this line of chips